Charles Gates may refer to:

Charles Gates, Jr. (1921–2005), businessman and philanthropist
Charles Gilbert Gates, owner of the first air conditioned home 
Charles W. Gates, governor of Vermont from 1915 to 1917